This is a list of the current 56 members of the House of Representatives of Cyprus, following the 2021 Cypriot legislative election.

List

References

See also 

 Politics of Cyprus

Politics of Cyprus
Lists of members of the House of Representatives (Cyprus)
Lists of current national legislators